Guillaume Norbert (born 14 October 1980) is a French professional football manager and former player who played as a midfielder. Norbert featured during his career for FC Lorient, US Créteil-Lusitanos, Angers, Nantes and Le Havre. 

He is the head coach of Racing Club de France Football.

Personal life
His brother, Ludwig, has also played professional football.

Honours

FC Lorient
Coupe de France finalist: 2002

References

External links

1980 births
Living people
People from Châtenay-Malabry
French footballers
FC Lorient players
US Créteil-Lusitanos players
Angers SCO players
FC Nantes players
Le Havre AC players
Ligue 1 players
Ligue 2 players
Association football midfielders
Footballers from Hauts-de-Seine